Ogborn is a surname. Notable people with the surname include:

Anne Ogborn (born 1959), American activist
Julie Ogborn (born 1958), Guam long-distance runner
Miles Ogborn (born 1950), British geographer

See also
Ogborn, Missouri
Osborn (surname)